Frédéric Labadie-Lagrave (16 August 1844 – 1917) was a French physician who made important contributions to medical literature.

Biography 
Born at Nérac (department of Lot-et-Garonne), Labadie-Lagrave studied medicine in Paris. During the Franco-Prussian War, while still a resident, he saved a large convoy and was decorated on the battleground at Metz. He took his doctor's degree in 1873. In 1879 he became médecin des hôpitaux in Paris, practicing notably at the Charité hospital.

With Germain Sée (1818–1896), Labadie-Lagrave wrote the multi-volume Médecine clinique, to which he made extensive contributions on urology and diseases of the liver, kidneys and bile ducts. Sée's lectures on the diagnostic and treatment of heart diseases were published under his care.

With Felix Legueu (1863–1939) he published Traité médico-chirurgical de gynécologie, an influential book on medical-surgical gynecology.

He also contributed numerous articles to Sigismond Jaccoud's Nouveau dictionnaire de médecine et de chirurgie pratiques (for example, articles on gout, hydrophobia, meninges, nerves).

Labadie-Lagrave translated the first American treatise about neurology, W. A. Hammond's Diseases of the nervous system, C. A. Wunderlich's pioneer German book on body temperature Das Verhalten der Eigenwärme in Krankheiten and Siegmund Rosenstein's Die Pathologie und Therapie der Nierenkrankheiten. 

He retired in 1909.

Works

Lists of works 
 An 1879 list of works
 List of works on Sudoc (27 titles, 2012-04-08)
 List of online works on Gallica (7 titles, 2012-04-08)

Selected works 
 Labadie-Lagrave, Frédéric, Observations de paralysie ascendante aiguë
 
 Hammond, William Alexander (1879); Labadie-Lagrave, Frédéric (Translation and notes) (8vo), Traité des maladies du système nerveux : comprenant les maladies du cerveau, les maladies de la moelle et de ses enveloppes, les affections cérébro-spinales, les maladies du système nerveux périphérique et les maladies toxiques du système nerveux. Paris: J.-B. Baillière et fils. Retrieved 2012-03-30. (Translated from Hammond's Treatise on Diseases of the Nervous System)
 
 Sée, Germain (1883); Labadie-Lagrave, Frédéric (Ed.) (8vo), Du diagnostic et du traitement des maladies du cœur et en particulier de leurs formes anormales, par le professeur Germain Sée, leçons recueillies par le Dr F. Labadie-Lagrave. Paris: A. Delahaye & É. Lecrosnier. Retrieved 2012-03-30
 Labadie-Lagrave, Frédéric (1888) (8vo). , coll. Médecine clinique, vol. 4, Paris: Adrien Delahaye and Émile Lecrosnier

References 
 Obituary in the British Medical Journal, 1917 August 11; 2(2954): 201.

French urologists
French gynaecologists
Translators to French
Chevaliers of the Légion d'honneur
1844 births
1917 deaths
People from Nérac
19th-century translators
19th-century French physicians
20th-century French physicians